Saints Gordianus and Epimachus (also Gordian) were Roman martyrs, who are  commemorated on 10 May.

According to his funeral inscription, Gordianus was a boy, whose youth is contrasted with his mature faith. He was tortured and finally beheaded. His body was laid in a crypt on the Via Latina beside the body of Saint Epimachus, and the two saints gave their name to the cemetery of Gordianus and Epimachus. They are jointly venerated by the Catholic Church.

Charlemagne's Queen Hildegard of the Vinzgau presented Kempten Abbey with the relics of the saints. Along with the Virgin Mary, Gordianus and Epimachus are venerated as the abbey's patrons.

There are churches in Germany dedicated to the saints in: Aitrach, Legau, Merazhofen, Pleß, Stöttwang, and Unterroth, Germany; and also one in Blevio, Italy.

According to David Farmer, later Acts which make Gordianus a Roman judge who converted to Christianity are "worthless". Another Gordianus suffered martyrdom (place uncertain) with two companions, and is commemorated 17 September (Acta SS., XLV, 483); and a third, commemorated on 13 September, who with several companions was martyred in Pontus or Galatia (Acta SS XLIV, 55).

References

Saints duos
362 deaths
Year of birth unknown